Thomas E. Stidham (March 25, 1905 – January 29, 1964) was an American football player, coach, and college athletics administrator.  He served as the head football coach at the University of Oklahoma from 1937 to 1940 and Marquette University from 1941 to 1945, compiling a career record of 47–30–5.

Coaching career
Stidham was the head coach of the Oklahoma Sooners football program from 1937 to 1940. During his tenure there, he compiled a 27–8–3 (.750) record. His best season came in 1938, when his team went 10–1, losing only to Tennessee, 17–0, in the Orange Bowl.

Stidham was the 15th head football coach at Marquette University and he held that position for five seasons, from 1941 until 1945.  His coaching record at Marquette was 20–22–2.

Head coaching record

References

1905 births
1964 deaths
American football tackles
Baltimore Colts (1947–1950) coaches
Green Bay Packers coaches
Haskell Indian Nations Fighting Indians football players
Marquette Golden Avalanche football coaches
Northwestern Wildcats football coaches
Oklahoma Sooners athletic directors
Oklahoma Sooners football coaches
People from Checotah, Oklahoma